Gulliver's Land is a children's theme park in Milton Keynes, England. It opened in 1999 and is the third park to be opened by Gulliver's. (The other two parks are Gulliver's World and Gulliver's Kingdom). The park has been designed especially for families. The Adventurers Village is now part of the resort, providing themed accommodation and short break packages. Gulliver's Land resort includes Splash Zone, Blast Arena, The SFEAR and Dinosaur and Farm Park. 

Gulliver's Land features a number of classic theme park rides, attractions and shows for children aged 2 to 13. A JCB Zone was introduced in 2017, launched in partnership with JCB. The themed area gives children the opportunity to experience JCB themed rides and attractions. 

Gulliver's Land is typically open from February until December.

Gulliver's Land Resort 
The theme park has expanded over the years and now includes a selection of accommodation at the nearby Adventurers Village Resort. Accommodation types include cabins, lodges, dens and glamping tents. Accessible accommodation is now available, with the resort offering accessible lodges and tents. Short break packages include entry to the main theme park, splash zone and dinosaur and farm park.

Adventurers Village accommodation types 

 Lost World Cabins
 Dino Dens
 Safari Glamping Tents
 Wild West Lodges
 Beach Dens
 Deluxe Dino Dens
 JCB Dens (From 2017)

Dinosaur and Farm Park 

Dinosaur and Farm Park is located next to the main theme park. This is a standalone attraction and notable for its collection of animatronic dinosaurs of various sizes. Voted one of the best dinosaur attractions in the UK, Dinosaur and Farm Park is split into two sections. The Farm Park area has farmyard animals alongside interactive farmyard attractions.

Blast Arena 

Blast Arena at Gulliver's Land is one of three official Blast Arenas operated by Gulliver's. The other two are located at Warrington, Cheshire and Matlock Bath, Derbyshire. Blast Arena goggles, vest and blaster are provided to each participant. Blast Arena is suitable for children aged 6 and over. The attraction is completely indoors, with the option of a birthday party package. 

The Blast Arena centre is located within Dinosaur and Farm Park, close to Splash Zone and The SFEAR.

Splash Zone 
One of the first standalone attractions at Gulliver's Land, Splash Zone is a water playground situated indoors. There is no standing water; the splash area consists of water play elements such as cannons, sprays and a giant tipping bucket.

Additional watersides 

In Summer 2017 the Splash Zone attraction launched 3 new waterslides.

Theme Park Rides 

*On rides with no minimum height restriction, children must be able to sit in an upright position unaided.

Incidents

See also
Gulliver's World
Gulliver's Kingdom

References

External links
 Official Website
 Interview with the Gulliver's Managing Director

Amusement parks in England
Milton Keynes
1999 establishments in England
Amusement parks opened in 1999